Hollybush is a small village in Worcestershire at the southern end of the Malvern Hills and close to the borders of both Gloucestershire and Herefordshire. There is a small church, All Saints, and village hall but no shop or pub . The post office closed some years back  as did the stone quarry .

History

At the time of the 1901 census there was a blacksmith and a number of residents were recorded as being glove makers along with quarrymen, postmen and farm labourers .

References 

Villages in Worcestershire